Goshamahal is a suburb in Hyderabad City, Telangana, India.

The Goshamahal Baradari is probably the only well preserved palace built by the Qutb Shahi rulers, as almost all their palaces were destroyed during the long siege of the kingdom by Aurangzeb. It was built by the last Qutb Shahi ruler, Sultan Abul Hassan Tana Shah in 1684. Apparently, during Aurangzeb's conquest of the Deccan, he installed his son Shah Alam in this palace, which later served as the Mughal headquarters in the south. It also has an underground route(Guffa) to Charminar and some other places.

Later, in the early 20th century, the 7th Nizam of Hyderabad handed this palace over to the Freemasons of Hyderabad and Secunderabad  and it has been in their care ever since.

References

Neighbourhoods in Hyderabad, India